Odostomia palmeri is a species of sea snail, a marine gastropod mollusc in the family Pyramidellidae, the pyrams and their allies.

Description
The shell is very small, measuring 1.4 mm. It is elongate-ovate, semitranslucent, bluish-white. The nuclear whorls are deeply, obliquely immersed in the first of the succeeding turns, above which only the tilted edge of the last volution projects. The four post-nuclear whorls are well rounded, feebly shouldered at the summit. They are marked by exceedingly fine, almost vertical lines of growth and microscopic spiral striations. The sutures are strongly impressed. The periphery and the rather long base of the body whorl are well rounded, marked like the spire. The aperture is very large, regularly ovate. The posterior angle is obtuse. The outer lip is  thin. The inner lipis  very oblique, almost straight, very slender and very slightly revolute. The parietal wall is glazed with a thin callus.

Distribution
This species occurs off the head of the Gulf of California.

References

External links
 To USNM Invertebrate Zoology Mollusca Collection
 To World Register of Marine Species

palmeri
Gastropods described in 1912